Dublin Landings is a commercial and residential development in the Docklands Strategic Development Zone and within the International Financial Services Centre (IFSC), Dublin, Ireland. The development includes 300 private rented sector apartments, 70,000 sq m of commercial space and 1,600 sq m of retail and leisure space. The  site was developed by the Ballymore Group and Oxley Holdings and as of 2022 occupiers include tenants such as WeWork, the NTMA, National Asset Management Agency and the Central Bank of Ireland.

Greystar acquired 268 apartments and 210 car parking spaces in July 2019 for an estimated €154.6m. A South Korean real estate investment trust, JR AMC, acquired 2 Dublin Landings for €106.5m in November 2018 and the Central Bank of Ireland acquired building 4 and 5 for a combined €210m in the same period. The 2 Dublin Landings building has since been renamed Treasury Dock. In December 2019, the developers agreed to sell Number 3 Dublin Landings to IPUT plc for €115m.

The development includes the original planned site of the headquarters of Anglo Irish Bank.

Notable buildings
 Central Bank of Ireland headquarters and former site of Anglo Irish Bank headquarters
 NTMA headquarters at 'Treasury Dock'

Gallery

References

Dublin Docklands
North Wall, Dublin
Places in Dublin (city)
Redeveloped ports and waterfronts
Quays in Dublin (city)
Office buildings in the Republic of Ireland
Apartment buildings in the Republic of Ireland